Anthony Paul Firkser (born February 19, 1995) is an American football tight end for the Atlanta Falcons of the National Football League (NFL). He played college football at Harvard and signed with the New York Jets as an undrafted free agent in 2017. Firkser also spent time on the Kansas City Chiefs' practice squad.

Early years
Firkser was born in Englishtown, New Jersey, to Alex and Donna Firkser. He is Jewish, and he and his family, including his brothers Josh and Thomas, belonged to Temple Shaari Emeth in Manalapan, where he celebrated his bar mitzvah.

High school career
Firkser was a multi-sport athlete at Manalapan High School. In basketball, Firkser played point guard, scoring 21.3 points with 7.6 assists per game. He finished his career second in school history with 1,362 points. In his senior year, the Shore Basketball Coaches named Firkser the Shore Conference Co-Player of the Year. He was also named the Shore Conference ‘A’ North Division Offensive Player of the Year and made the all-state team. 

He competed at the 2013 Maccabiah Games in Israel as a guard for the 18-and-under gold medal-winning Team USA basketball team. On the team, he played alongside Spencer Weisz.

Firkser did not begin playing football until his sophomore year in high school. During Firkser's three-year high school career, the Manalapan football team went 30–6 and won three consecutive ‘A’ North Division titles. During one stretch, Manalapan had an 18-game winning streak within the division. After a semifinal visit in the state playoffs his sophomore year, Firkser and his teammates played for the NJSIAA Central Jersey title in his junior and senior years.  While at Manalapan, Firkser set career school records in receptions (110), receiving yards (2,118) and touchdown receptions (19). After his senior year, he was named All-Shore Offensive Player of the Year as a senior wide receiver. Firkser also was a two-time All-Shore first-team selection.

College career
Firkser was recruited by Harvard University and four other universities. Citing the university's academic program and the school's willingness to let him play both basketball and football, Firkser committed to play for coach Tim Murphy at Harvard on October 17, 2012.

Firkser saw his first collegiate action in 2014 as a sophomore.  He appeared in 10 games for Harvard and made 32 catches for 485 yards. His four touchdown receptions tied for first on the team and he ranked second on the team in both catches and yards. After the season, Firkser was named to the All-Ivy second-team.  Firkser started nine games and caught 22 passes for 372 yards and three touchdowns in 2015 as a junior. For the second consecutive season, he was named to the All-Ivy League second-team. As a senior in 2016, Firkser started all 10 games for Harvard and made 45 receptions for 702 yards and seven touchdowns.  He was named to the All-Ivy League first-team.

At the end of his collegiate career, Firkser ranked 12th all-time in school history in receptions, ninth all-time in receiving yards, and sixth all-time in touchdown receptions. He graduated from Harvard in 2017 with a degree in applied mathematics. During the 2018 offseason, Firkser participated in actuarial credential exams in hopes of potentially pursuing a post-football career as an actuary.

College statistics

Professional career
Coming into the 2017 NFL Draft, scouting reports projected Firkser to best fit with an NFL team in a role of a fullback/tight end hybrid player. Scouts believed Firkser was tough, intelligent, and relatively athletic. Scouts also praised him for his ability to quickly get into pass routes and adjust to errant throws. However, scouts negatively viewed him as possessing just average size and questioned his strength as a blocker.

On March 19, 2017, Firkser participated in the Harvard Pro Day, an event at which Harvard football players demonstrate their skills to an audience of NFL scouts and coaches. Nearly half of the NFL teams attended this event.

New York Jets
Firkser signed with the New York Jets as an undrafted free agent on May 5, 2017. He was waived by the Jets on September 2, 2017.

Kansas City Chiefs
On November 29, 2017, Firkser was signed to the Kansas City Chiefs' practice squad. He signed a reserve/future contract with the Chiefs on January 8, 2018. He was waived on April 30, 2018.

Tennessee Titans
On May 14, 2018, Firkser was signed by the Tennessee Titans.

2018 season

In the preseason, Firkser was second on the team in both receptions (10) and receiving yards (108). On September 1, 2018, he was named to the Titans' initial 53-man roster. He was waived by the Titans on September 17, and was re-signed to the practice squad the next day. He was promoted to the active roster on October 8. During Week 6, Firkser caught his first NFL reception in a 21–0 shoutout loss to the Baltimore Ravens. During a Week 13 26–22 victory over the New York Jets, Firkser scored his first NFL career touchdown on a 12-yard reception from Marcus Mariota.

Firkser finished the 2018 season with 19 receptions for 225 yards and a touchdown.

2019 season

Firkser began the season as one of four tight ends on the Titans' opening day roster along with veterans Delanie Walker, Jonnu Smith, and MyCole Pruitt. For the first six weeks of the regular season, Firkser played sparingly and was even a healthy inactive in Week 4. During that six-week span, he caught just one pass for 25 yards. After Walker was later placed on injured reserve, Firkser played a larger role in the Titans offense. During Week 10 against the Kansas City Chiefs, he caught three receptions for 36 yards and his only touchdown of the regular season as the Titans won by a score of 35–32.

Firkser finished the 2019 season with 14 receptions for 204 yards and a touchdown. Ironically, Firkser's first two career touchdowns were against the Jets and Chiefs – the two teams that had previously waived him.

The Titans finished the regular season with a 9–7 record and were the sixth seed in the AFC playoffs. Firkser played his first postseason game on January 4, 2020, against the defending Super Bowl champions, the New England Patriots. In that game, he caught two passes for 23 yards and a touchdown in the Titans' 20–13 upset road victory. With the touchdown, Firkser became the first player from Harvard to score a touchdown in an NFL postseason game. Firkser's final reception of the season was also the final touchdown of the Titans' 2019 season. He caught a 22-yard touchdown pass in the fourth quarter of the AFC Championship Game in a 35–24 road loss to the Chiefs.

2020 season
On February 13, 2020, Firkser signed a one-year extension with the Titans. 

During Week 6, Firkser recorded his first career 100-yard receiving game in a 42–36 overtime victory against the Houston Texans. Firkser finished the game catching eight of nine targets from Ryan Tannehill for 113 yards and a touchdown in the first quarter.

Firkser finished the 2020 season with 39 receptions for 387 yards and a touchdown. In the Wildcard round of the playoffs, he caught two passes for 44 yards in a 20-13 loss to the Baltimore Ravens.

2021 season
On March 17, 2021, Firkser re-signed with the Titans on a one-year deal.

During Week 11 against the Houston Texans, Firkser scored his first touchdown of the season when he recovered a fumble in the end zone. He finished the 22–13 loss with five receptions for 26 yards and the aforementioned touchdown. During a Week 17 34–3 victory over the Miami Dolphins, Firkser caught three passes for 24 yards and his first receiving touchdown of the season. In the regular-season finale against the Texans, Firkser had four receptions for 56 yards and a touchdown in the 28–25 road victory.

Firkser finished the 2021 season with 34 receptions for 291 yards and two touchdowns.

Atlanta Falcons 
On April 12, 2022, Firkser signed a one-year deal with the Atlanta Falcons. He was released on August 30. He was signed to the practice squad the next day. He was promoted to the active roster on September 13.

NFL career statistics

Regular season

Postseason

Personal life
Firkser volunteers with his former high school football coach to help train and give advice to aspiring young football players in his hometown community of Manalapan. He enjoys pencil drawings, jigsaw puzzles and playing online collectible card games. His older brother, Josh, played football at Wagner.

See also
List of select Jewish football players

References

External links
Tennessee Titans bio
Harvard Crimson bio

1995 births
Living people
American football tight ends
Atlanta Falcons players
Harvard Crimson football players
Manalapan High School alumni
People from Manalapan Township, New Jersey
Players of American football from New Jersey
Sportspeople from Monmouth County, New Jersey
Tennessee Titans players
Jewish American sportspeople
Competitors at the 2013 Maccabiah Games
Maccabiah Games basketball players of the United States
Maccabiah Games gold medalists for the United States
Jewish men's basketball players
21st-century American Jews